Tom James (born June 7, 1929) is an American politician. He served as a Democratic member in the Texas House of Representatives from 1959 to 1963.

References

1929 births
Living people
Members of the Texas House of Representatives